Sir Roger Michael De Haan, CBE, DL (born October 1948, Northampton) is the son of the late Sidney De Haan, who created the Saga group of companies, best known for selling holidays to the over-50s market. De Haan took over Saga in 1984 when his father retired, and then ran the company with his brother Peter for a further twenty years, launching Saga-branded radio stations to accompany the group's holidays and financial services.

He chose to leave the business in 2004, selling the entire Saga Group (which included insurance and holiday businesses) to a management buyout for £1.35 billion, although he continued to run some of the radio stations himself. In that year he bought Folkestone Harbour for £11 million.

The Roger De Haan Charitable Trust was established in 1978, offering charitable support to a variety of charities and community organisations, mostly in the area around Folkestone and south east Kent.

Following the sale of Saga, he retained ownership of two digital radio stations, PrimeTime Radio and Saga Radio (Digital), but following continuing heavy losses took the decision to close them in 2006.

Wealth
He regularly appears in the Sunday Times' 'rich list'. In April 2016, his net worth was estimated at £900 million, according to the Sunday Times Rich List.

During the 2019 United Kingdom general election, De Haan donated £125,000 to the Conservative Party and £3,000 to Damian Collins, the Conservative MP for Folkestone and Hythe.

Honours
In 2003/2004 he was awarded an honorary fellowship of Canterbury Christ Church University.

De Haan was appointed Commander of the Order of the British Empire (CBE) in 2004 for services to business, education and charity in 2004 and was knighted in the 2014 New Years Honours List for services to education and to charity in Kent and overseas.

References

External links
Independent – Announcement of retirement from Saga (November 2003).
Interview with the Sandgate News (December 2005).
Marketing Week ‘most influential business personality in the South of England’ (July 2005)
Telegraph – Interview with Clive Aslet (July 2007)

1948 births
Living people
People educated at Seaford College
English businesspeople
English billionaires
Commanders of the Order of the British Empire
Deputy Lieutenants of Kent
Knights Bachelor
People from Northampton
Conservative Party (UK) donors